For the swimming competitions at the 2020 Summer Olympics, the following qualification systems are in place. As the Olympics was postponed to 2021 due to the COVID-19 pandemic, qualification ends on 27 June 2021.

Qualifying standards
A National Olympic Committee (NOC) may enter a maximum of two qualified athletes in each individual event, but only if both athletes have attained the Olympic Qualifying Time (OQT). One athlete per event can potentially enter if they meet the Olympic Selection Time (OST) or if the quota of 878 athletes has not been targeted. NOCs may also permit swimmers regardless of time (one per gender) under a Universality place, since they have no swimmers reaching either of the standard entry times (OQT/OST).

In the relay events, a maximum of 16 qualifying teams in each relay event must be permitted to accumulate a total of 112 relay teams; each NOC may enter only one team. The first twelve teams in each relay event at the 2019 World Championships will automatically compete for the relay events at the Olympics; while the remaining four per relay event must obtain their fastest entry times based on the FINA World Rankings during the process.

Because of the exceptional circumstances related to COVID-19 crisis, the consequent Olympic delay, and the unprecedented two-year gap between the Worlds and the new date of the Games, FINA revised the universality rule that allowed a nation to enter the highest-ranked male and female swimmer, respectively, based upon the Points Table (2021 edition). Swimmers from NOCs, having achieved the OST allocated to the universality place, may be entered to a maximum of two individual events, whereas those without the OQT and OST were limited to enter in one individual event only.

Following the end of the qualification period, FINA will assess the number of athletes having achieved the OQT, the number of relay-only swimmers, and the number of Universality places, before inviting athletes with OST to fulfill the total quota of 878. Additionally, OST places will be distributed by event according to the position of the FINA World Rankings during the qualifying deadline.

The qualifying time standards must be obtained in World Championships, Continental Championships, Continental Qualification Events, National Championships and Trials, or International Competitions approved by FINA in the period between 1 March 2019 to 27 June 2021.

The initial FINA qualifying standards, still to be ratified, are as follows:

Individual events 
Those who have achieved the Olympic Qualifying Time (OQT) or the Olympic Selection Time (OST), or have been guaranteed a Universality place are listed below for each of the following individual events.

Men's individual events

Men's 50 m freestyle

Men's 100 m freestyle

Men's 200 m freestyle

Men's 400 m freestyle

Men's 800 m freestyle

Men's 1500 m freestyle

Men's 100 m backstroke

Men's 200 m backstroke

Men's 100 m breaststroke

Men's 200 m breaststroke

Men's 100 m butterfly

Men's 200 m butterfly

Men's 200 m individual medley

Men's 400 m individual medley

Women's individual events

Women's 50 m freestyle

Women's 100 m freestyle

Women's 200 m freestyle

Women's 400 m freestyle

Women's 800 m freestyle

Women's 1500 m freestyle

Women's 100 m backstroke

Women's 200 m backstroke

Women's 100 m breaststroke

Women's 200 m breaststroke

Women's 100 m butterfly

Women's 200 m butterfly

Women's 200 m individual medley

Women's 400 m individual medley

Relay events 

16 teams qualify in each relay event, for a total of 112 relay teams.

Teams can qualify by one of two routes:

The twelve highest placed nations in relay events at the 18th FINA World Championships 2019 in Gwangju qualified for the corresponding relay event at the Olympic Games Tokyo 2020 based upon the results achieved in the heats.
 The remaining four teams per relay event will be the teams with the fastest times in the FINA World Rankings of 31 May 2021 achieved during the qualification period, in the qualifying events approved by FINA
 If any of the qualified teams from either group are not able to participate for any reason, the next highest ranked eligible team from the FINA World Rankings will be offered the relay team quota place.

Qualification summary

Men's  freestyle relay

Men's  freestyle relay

Men's  medley relay

Women's  freestyle relay

Women's  freestyle relay

Women's  medley relay

Mixed  medley relay

Open water events

Timeline

Men's 10 km marathon 

° Unused host quota place
^ Unused continental quota place
No eligible athlete from Oceania competed in the men's race at the 2020 Olympic Marathon Swim Qualifier, which meant the top 10 qualified.

Women's 10 km marathon 

^ Unused continental quota place
No eligible athlete from Oceania competed in the women's race at the 2020 Olympic Marathon Swim Qualifier, which meant the top 10 qualified.

Notes

References

2020
Qualification for the 2020 Summer Olympics